Tuthill may refer to:

People with the surname
Anna Tuthill Symmes or Anna Harrison (1775–1864), wife of President William Henry Harrison and grandmother of President Benjamin Harrison
David Tuthill Jennings (born 1952), former American football punter
George Leman Tuthill (1772–1835), English physician
Harry J. Tuthill (1886–1957), American cartoonist known for his comic strip The Bungle Family
James Tuthill (born 1976), former American football placekicker 
John W. Tuthill (1910–1996), American diplomat stationed in Latin America, Canada, and Europe
Joseph H. Tuthill (1811–1877), U.S. Representative from New York, nephew of Selah Tuthill
Kathleen Villiers-Tuthill, Irish historical writer
Louisa Caroline Huggins Tuthill (1799–1879), American author of children's books
Mary Tuthill Lindheim (1912–2004), born Mary Barbara Tuthill, American sculptor and studio potter
Selah Tuthill (1771–1821), American politician from New York
William Tuthill (1855–1929), American architect celebrated for designing New York City's Carnegie Hall

Places
Tuthill, South Dakota, unincorporated community in Bennett County, South Dakota, United States
Tuthill Quarry, Site of Special Scientific Interest in the Easington district of north-east County Durham, England

See also
Battle of Tuthill took place at Caernarfon in 1401 during the revolt of Owain Glyndŵr
David Tuthill Farmstead, historic farm complex at Cutchogue in Suffolk County, New York
Jesse and Ira Tuthill House, historic home at Mattituck in Suffolk County, New York
Tuthill-Green House, historic home at Moravia in Cayuga County, New York
Tuthill-Lapham House, also known as Friendly Hall, historic home at Wading River in Suffolk County, New York
Duthil
Titty Hill
Todt Hill
Toot Hill (disambiguation)
Tothill
Tothill (surname)
Tutt Hill (disambiguation)